The Panasonic Lumix DMC-TZ3 was a compact 'Travel Zoom' camera announced on January 31, 2007. It was the successor to the 2006 TZ1 announced in 2006, and was released in parallel with the TZ2. It has a 10× optical zoom with the focal range equivalent to 28–280 mm (35 mm film equivalent) coupled with Mega O.I.S. image stabiliser. It is a fully automatic compact camera, without manual control of aperture and shutter time. The TZ3 was awarded both the TIPA "Best Superzoom Digital Camera" award and the EISA "European Compact Camera" award in 2007.
The TZ4, TZ5 (known as TZ15 in Asia, Australia and New Zealand), and TZ50 succeeded the TZ2 and TZ3.

References 

Superzoom cameras
TZ03
Live-preview digital cameras
Digital cameras with CCD image sensor